Bishanpur  is a village in Kapurthala district of Punjab State, India. The village is administrated by a Sarpanch who is an elected representative of village as per the constitution of India and Panchayati raj (India).

Demography 
According to the report published by Census India in 2011, Bishanpur has a total number of 292 houses and population of 1,479 of which include 732 males and 747 females. Literacy rate of Bishanpur is   78.74%, higher than state average of 75.84%.  The population of children under the age of 6 years is 157 which is 10.62% of total population of Bishanpur, and child sex ratio is approximately  1039, higher than state average of 846.

Population data

Air travel connectivity 
The closest airport to the village is Sri Guru Ram Dass Jee International Airport.

Villages in Kapurthala

External links
  Villages in Kapurthala
 Kapurthala Villages List

References

Villages in Kapurthala district